Larisa Savchenko-Neiland and Natasha Zvereva were the defending champions but were defeated in the quarterfinals by Sandy Collins and Elna Reinach.

Collins and Reinach were defeated in the final by Nicole Provis and Elizabeth Smylie, 6–3, 6–4.

Seeds
Champion seeds are indicated in bold text while text in italics indicates the round in which those seeds were eliminated. The top four seeded teams received byes into the second round.

Draw

Finals

Top half

Bottom half

External links
 1991 Dow Classic Draws

Birmingham Classic (tennis)
1991 WTA Tour